Mimabryna nicobarica is a species of beetle in the family Cerambycidae. It was described by Stephan von Breuning in 1938. It is known from the Nicobar and Andaman Islands.

References

Pteropliini
Beetles described in 1938